The National Romanian Fascio was a small fascist group that was active in Romania for a short time during the 1920s. 

Led by Titus Panaitescu Vifor, the group emerged from the short-lived National Fascist Party in 1921 and, at its peak, had around 1,500 members. It defined itself as national socialist, and generally it pursued a policy of corporatism, land reform and support for the creation of agricultural cooperatives. It was critical of capitalism and also espoused antisemitism. The movement's main areas of influence were Western Moldavia, Bukovina, and Banat.

The party merged with the National Italo-Romanian Cultural and Economical Movement in 1923 to form the National Fascist Movement, although a small rump movement carried on, with little significance. Both groups shared a close affinity to Italian fascism which facilitated their merger.

External links
 

Defunct political parties in Romania
Fascist parties in Romania
Political parties established in 1921
1923 disestablishments in Romania
1921 establishments in Romania
Romanian nationalist parties